The Matthews family is a prominent family in American football. One of only five third-generation families to play in the National Football League (NFL), it is often called the "NFL's First Family". Its seven members who have played in the NFL have combined for 25 Pro Bowl invitations, 11 first-team All-Pro selections, and three Super Bowl appearances.

History
The family patriarch, H. L. Matthews, was born in Jeffersonville, Ohio, in 1889. After serving in World War I, he held tenures as a boxing, baseball, and track coach for The Citadel, The Military College of South Carolina from 1926 to 1953.

H. L. Matthews' son, Clay Matthews Sr., began the family's legacy in football. After playing football in college for the Georgia Tech Yellow Jackets, he was drafted in the 1949 NFL Draft by the Los Angeles Rams, but never played for the team. He instead joined the San Francisco 49ers in 1950 and played offensive tackle, defensive tackle, and defensive end. His career was interrupted by the Korean War, in which he served as a paratrooper. He rejoined the 49ers in 1953 and played for three more seasons before retiring. Matthews Sr. died on March 24, 2017, aged 88.

Two of Matthews Sr.'s sons played in the NFL: Clay Matthews Jr. and Bruce Matthews. Each played college football for the USC Trojans, and they were both selected in the first round of their respective drafts; Clay Jr. in 1978 and Bruce in 1983. Clay Jr. was a linebacker for the Cleveland Browns from 1978 to 1993 and Atlanta Falcons from 1994 to 1996. With the Browns, he played in four Pro Bowls and in 1984 was a first-team All-Pro selection. Bruce, a highly versatile offensive lineman, played guard, tackle, center, and snapper, for the Houston / Tennessee Oilers / Titans franchise from 1983 to 2001. He was invited to a record-tying 14 Pro Bowls and was a nine-time first-team All-Pro selection. Bruce was inducted into the Pro Football Hall of Fame in 2007. Clay Jr. and Bruce are the only brothers to play on the same Pro Bowl team, doing so for the American Football Conference in both 1988 and 1989.

Three sons of Clay Jr. have played football past the high school level: Kyle, Clay III, and Casey. The oldest, Kyle, was a safety for the USC Trojans. Clay III, a linebacker, also played for the Trojans. Clay III was drafted by Green Bay Packers in 2009, with whom he has earned six Pro Bowl selections, a victory in Super Bowl XLV, appeared in three NFC Championship Games (most recently of the 2016–17 NFL playoffs where he faced off against his cousin Jake), and is the franchise's all-time sacks leader.
Casey Matthews played linebacker for the Oregon Ducks, after which he played in the NFL for the Philadelphia Eagles from 2011 to 2014 and Minnesota Vikings in 2015.

Bruce has seven children, including five sons, two of whom have played in the NFL: Kevin and Jake. Kevin was a center for the Titans, Washington Redskins, and Carolina Panthers from 2010 to 2014. Jake has been an offensive tackle for the Falcons since being drafted by the team sixth overall in 2014. In the NFC championship game of the 2016–17 NFL playoffs, he and the Falcons defeated his cousin Clay III and the Packers to advance to Super Bowl LI. A third brother, Mike, has spent time on off-season rosters of the Cleveland Browns and Pittsburgh Steelers A fourth brother, Luke, is a sophomore for the Texas A&M Aggies, where each of his brothers played.

Troy Niklas, the nephew of Bruce Matthews by way of Bruce's wife's sister, is a former tight end for the Arizona Cardinals, and a current free agent.

Professional soccer player Ashley Nick is a granddaughter of Clay Matthews Sr.

Matthews family tree

H. L. "Matty" Matthews (1889–1975)
Clay Matthews Sr. (1928–2017)
Clay Matthews Jr. (born 1956)
Kyle Matthews (born 1982)
Clay Matthews III (born 1986)
Casey Matthews (born 1989)
Bruce Matthews (born 1961)
Kevin Matthews (born 1987)
Jake Matthews (born 1992)
Mike Matthews (born 1994)
Luke Matthews (born 2000)

In media
In 2017, Clay Jr., Clay III, and Casey were featured in a commercial for PlayStation Vue entitled "Football VUEing Family", which was filmed at Clay Jr.'s home in Southern California. Also in the commercial were Clay Jr.'s wife Leslie and daughter Jennifer.

See also
 Poe brothers, a family of American football players in the late 19th century
 Nesser brothers, a family of American football players in the early 20th century

References

Matthews football family
National Football League families